Germi County is in the northern part of Ardabil province, Iran. At the 2006 census, the county's population was 89,248 in 18,710 households. The following census in 2011 counted 84,267 people in 21,156 households. At the 2016 census, the county's population was 76,901 in 22,349 households. Angut District was separated from the county in December 2020 to form Ungut County.

Almost all of the people of this county are Shia Muslim and speak in Azeri. According to the book: "Investigating the Social Structure of Shahsavan Tribe" the first time that Turk tribes enter into the Mugan will mark the return to the era of Sultan Mahmud Ghaznavi successors in the fifth century. In the seventh century, the Tatar tribes overcome the Turkmens and threw them from the area.

Administrative divisions

The population history of Germi County's administrative divisions over three consecutive censuses is shown in the following table. The latest census shows three districts, nine rural districts, and two cities.

Appellation and etymology 
When it comes to the etymology of "Germi", it seems somewhat cryptic. The earliest book or document which has written about this area dates back to year 22 Hijri (about 671 AD Gregorian calendar) when Arab soldiers entered the Aran or Alan region. It is believed that before the Islamic era, Alans people were living in this area.  Words such as Alania, Allan-shahr, Alan-shahr, and Alan-shah had been used initially during the first century AD, for this district was located between Azerbaijan, Shirvan, The Caspian sea and Armenia. Many Alan people migrated from this area after the Islamic era and were replaced by Muslim people from different ethnic groups. After that, the area between those four borders was known as Mugan or Amukan and other pronunciation of them.

Many historians believe the word "Germi" has Parthian or Alanian stems. Many others suggest that ritual words stem from religions such as Mithraism.

There are two theories that believe Germi is the combination of two words: Ger and mi, but there are different interpretations. One group believes that the Sumerian stem of "Ger" means village and "Mi" means celestial. the other group believes that "Ger" comes from "Ager" in ancient Persian, which became "Akhgar" in the modern Persian language, and "mi" comes from "mehr" or "Mitra" which both means "Sun", so "Germi" would mean fireplace of sun. This interpretation is more consistent with other documents and evidence about the region and its history.

History 

The history of county is closely related to the history of the Mugan region. The history of Mugan is divided into 4 eras.

First: The ancient era 
There are enormous works from the ancient period in this era but there is not a complete museum about the region. Most of the ancient monuments discovered from the region, irrespective of the historical period, are held in several museums, such as The Iranian National Museum, The Kashan museum, The Copenhagen museum, and several others.

Second: The Parthian and Sassanian Era 
There are several stunning works from this era, such as daughter-castle in the north of the county, Langan Qantas, Barzand Castle.

Third: The early years of Islam to the Safavid Dynasty 
This era was not a flourishing period for the Mugan region. Due to the long period of wars, there were not any sign of progress, buildings, or outstanding monuments. The historical place in this county that had a large value during this era was Barzand Castle. That was the castle of Afshin who battled with Babak Khorramdin in an earlier century of Islamic history.

Fourth: The New Age (1734 AD to the present) 
Ignoring the three earlier historical periods, Germi city is relatively new by Iranian standards; it was established around the year 900 of the Islamic calendar when Shah Ismael allowed five Shia families to migrate to this region. There were some other places and cities in Azerbaijan of I.R. Iran and Azerbaijan that are also called Germi.

Climate and geography 

The city's area is almost 1,725 square kilometers. The altitude varies between 250 meters in the village of Khan Mohammad loo in the northwest, up to 2,200 meters in the southeast, where the Salavat Mountains are located.

The Moghan (Germi) region, due to its specific topographic conditions, has a different climate than other parts of Azerbaijan, or even its southern regions. The county has almost a Mediterranean climate.

Monsoon winds called Caspian Winds, which come from the Caspian Sea, greatly increase the cooling rate of the region. The distance between the Moghan (Germi) region and the Caspian Sea is about 80 to 90 km. In general, desipte the region's proximity to the sea, when considering the climatic division, this region can be considered as semi-arid, as the annual rainfall is less than 500 mm. The warm summer heat It is humid, and the region has a moderate winter. The winters are usually accompanied by cold, frosty, and foggy winds.

Precipitation, Springs, Rivers and Qanats 
This differs across the county: minimum precipitation is in the north-west in Khan-Mohammad-loo village at 250 mm, while maximum rainfall is at Dash-dibi village in south-east at 700mm.

There are 69 permanent fountains in the city, which puts it in the 4th rank of the province.

The county has 7 permanent rivers, but their water level varies between 10 million cubic meters to 1 billion cubic meters. The largest river of the county is Dareroud; The valley of the river originates from the slopes of Mount Sabalan and joins Aras river on the northern border of I.R. Iran passing through the counties of Ardabil, Meshkin-Shahr, Germi and Bilesuvar and joining several rivers along the route. This river is the largest internal river of Ardabil province.

Balhary/Bulgary/Balharood is another important river in the county. Part of the river's route helps to form the border between Iran and Azerbaijan.

Vegetation 

The range of lands and forests of the county are populated with different types of plants, trees and shrubs among the varieties of elm, oak, figs, mountain plums, hawthorn, apple, barberry, raspberries, sweetbrier, tamarisk, pine species and a variety of medicinal plants such as licorice, Styphnolobium japonicum, Malva sylvestris, spearmint, Echium, chamomile, yarrow, saffron Mountain, wilted sorrel, Rumex crispus, wild rue, Sorrel, Mountain tea and some other plants.

Iran has 3,400,000 hectares of national forest land, of which 5,000 hectares are located in this county. 3,000 hectares are in the central part of the county, and 2,000 hectares are in the Angoutian region.

Tulips, lily of the valley, varieties of jasmine, gladiolus, violas and some other flowers grow up throughout the different seasons and in the different parts of the county.

Economy 
While trade was the most important reason for the emergence and development of the city of Germi, The economy of the Germi region is primarily based on agriculture and animal husbandry, then public services, government services and commerce.

Other services, as well as industry and mining, have a very small share in the region's economy.

According to national development standards, Ardabil province is one of the less-developed provinces in Iran, and this province, Germi, is in 6th place for development.

Agriculture 
The main agricultural product of the county is cereals. All of the above-mentioned conditions allow farmers to reach sufficient yields while growing cereals. The cereal yield often exceeds that from provinces of Iran such as Yazd and Hormozgan. Wheat production from Germi measures to approximately 70,000 metric tonnes to 140,000 metric tonnes per year.

Nectarine, pomegranate, peach, quince, apple, walnut, fig, cherry, sour cherry, plum, berry, and blackberry are the main fruits of the county. The main garden product of Germi is nectarine, which exceeds 2,500 metric tons of yield per year. While the whole of Iranian nectarine production exceeds 1.1 million tonnes,  Germi has the best per hectare yield of nectarine by more than 40 tonnes per hectare.

Live animals, red meat, dairy products and poultry are among the other important products of region.

Industry 
Germi has two state-approved industrial towns as well as some small and large factories outside of industrial towns. Building materials, as well as valves and some consumer goods, are the industrial products of the region. The production of valves is the most important part of industrial production in the city, and entrepreneurs are rapidly developing the valve industry in the city.

References

 

Counties of Ardabil Province